Luz-Guerrero Early College High School was a public charter high school in Tucson, Arizona. It is operated by Luz Social Services, Inc.
The school had previously went by the name Luz Academy of Tucson, which remained the legal name of the charter holder.

On the same campus was Adalberto M. Guerrero Middle School, a middle school operated by the same company.
The Arizona State Board for Charter Schools filed a notice of intent to revoke the charter in April 2012. The school failed to submit its fiscal year 2011 audit. A hearing with an administrative law judge is scheduled to take place in August.

References

External links
 Luz Social Services website

Public high schools in Arizona
Schools in Tucson, Arizona
Charter schools in Arizona
1997 establishments in Arizona
Defunct schools in Arizona
2015 disestablishments in Arizona
Educational institutions established in 1997
Educational institutions disestablished in 2015